The Nordic Derivatives Exchange (NDX) is a derivatives market operated by the Nordic Growth Market. Both are supervised by the Swedish Financial Supervisory Authority,, and operate as electronic exchanges on a shared platform.

NDX was initially offered listing and trading of Warrants. The market place has now broadened to include listing and trading of bonds - known as NDX Bonds. The purpose of NDX is to offer issuers, and other market participants, a flexible market for all types of derivatives and structured products. 

In the period January–June 2006, warrants worth a total value of SEK 7.1 billion were 
traded on NDX.

References

External links
Nordic Derivatives Exchange Official Website
Swedish Financial Supervisory Authority

Economy of Stockholm
Economy of Sweden
Stock exchanges in Europe
Nordic organizations